The N32 road was a short national primary road in Ireland running from Junction 3 on the M50, to the Malahide road at Clare Hall.  It was effectively a non-motorway section of the M50 Dublin C-Ring, but is only built to primary road status. A short part of the route had motorway restrictions on it as lead to the M1 / M50 interchange (and was confusingly signposted as both N32 and M50), as only motorway traffic can access both routes. In 2013, the road was renumbered as R139.

Since the opening of the Dublin Port Tunnel the M50 is now extended, turning south to Dublin Port at the M1/M50/N32 junction where the M1 now terminates. 

For more details on the Dublin C-ring, see M50 motorway.

See also
Roads in Ireland
Motorways in Ireland
National secondary road
Regional road

References 
 Roads Act 1993 (Classification of National Roads) Order 2006 – Department of Transport
 Pathetic Motorways

32
Roads in County Dublin